4D film is a high technology, multisensory presentation system combining motion pictures with synchronized physical effects that occur in the theater. Effects simulated in 4D films may include motion, vibration, scent, rain, mist, bubbles, fog, smoke, wind, temperature changes, and strobe lights. Advanced seats in 4D venues vibrate and move during these multisensory presentations. Other common effects include air jets and water sprays. Auditorium effects may include smoke, rain, lightning, bubbles, and scent. 4D films are exhibited in every major global market in stadium seating multiplexes, and are exhibited via worldwide theatrical releases.

Multinational mobile 4D theatres include Cinetransformer venues. As of 2022, 4D films are exhibited in more than 65 countries globally. 4D motion pictures are also exhibited in theme parks.

History
The precursors of the modern 4D film presentation include Sensurround, which debuted in 1974 with the film Earthquake. Only a few films were presented in Sensurround, and it was supplanted by Dolby Stereo in 1977, which featured extended low frequencies and made subwoofers a common addition to cinema. Other notable efforts at pushing the boundaries of the film viewing experience include Fantasound, the first use of stereo sound; Cinemiracle and Cinerama, both widescreen formats utilizing multiple projectors; and Smell-O-Vision.

The Sensorium is regarded as the world's first commercial 4D film and was first screened in 1984 at Six Flags Power Plant in Baltimore. It was produced in partnership with Landmark Entertainment.

4DX, D-Box Technologies, and Mediamation all currently integrate 4D technology in global stadium seating multiplexes.

List of 4D presentation systems for film theatres 
The following is a list of 4D presentation systems developed for traditional film theatres.

Selected filmography

See also
 
 Avatar: Flight of Passage
 List of 4DX motion-enhanced films
 Tribeca Enterprises
 Walking simulator

Notes

References 

Motion picture film formats
3D films
1984 introductions